Events in the year 1917 in Norway.

Incumbents
Monarch – Haakon VII

Events
 The Bratsberg Line began rail traffic between Eidanger and Notodden. The line was closed in 2001.

Popular culture

Sports

2 April – Lillestrøm SK football club is founded after the merger of two local football clubs.
19 May – Rosenborg BK football club is founded.

Music

Film

Literature
The Knut Hamsun novel Markens Grøde Volume 1 & 2 (Growth of the Soil, was published.
 The Olav Duun novel På Lyngsøya (At Heather Island), was published.
The Mikkjel Fønhus debut novel Skoggangsmand (Outlaw), was published.

Notable births
20 January – Gunnar Bøe, economist and politician (died 1989)
1 February – Tor Aspengren, trade unionist (died 2004)
2 March – Haakon Tranberg, sprinter (died 1991)
6 March – Paul Svarstad, politician (died 1998)
5 May – Aage Eriksen, wrestler and Olympic silver medallist (died 1998)
12 May – Johan Berg, military officer (died 1981)
16 May – Arne Røgden, bobsledder (died 2002)
17 May – Ragnvald Winjum, jurist and politician (died 1965)
25 May – Brynjulv Sjetne, politician (died 1976)
2 June – Sverre Bratland, military leader (died 2002)
14 June – Atle Selberg, mathematician (died 2007)
15 June – Einfrid Perstølen, psychiatrist and language proponent (died 2017)
3 July – Brita Collett Paus, humanitarian leader and founder of Fransiskushjelpen (died 1998)
18 July – Harald Nikolai Brøvig, politician (died 2010)
23 July – Knut Brynildsen, international soccer player (died 1986)
12 August – Ebba Haslund, novelist, short story writer, playwright, essayist, children's writer, literary critic, radio speaker and politician (died 2009)
13 August – Lulla Einrid Fossland, politician (died 2009)
3 September – Bjarne Hanssen, politician (died 2014)
23 September – Knut Haugland, resistance fighter and explorer (died 2009)
26 September – Åslaug Linge Sunde, politician (died 2006)
3 October – Odd Lundberg, speed skater and Olympic silver medallist (died 1983)
7 October – Godtfred Holmvang, decathlete and skier (died 2006)
16 October – Aasmund Brynildsen, essayist, biographer, magazine editor and publishing house consultant (died 1974)
26 October – Kaare Steel Groos, politician (died 1994)
5 November – Jens Evensen, lawyer, judge, politician and Minister (died 2004)
18 November – Ragnar Kvam, journalist, novelist, translator and literary critic (died 2006)
30 November – Arne Konrad Eldegard, banker and politician (died 2018)
5 December – Wenche Foss, actress (died 2011)
13 December – Jan Baalsrud, resistance member (died 1988)
15 December – Gregers Gram, resistance fighter and saboteur (died 1944)
19 December – Olaf Dufseth, Nordic combined and cross-country skier (died 2009)
23 December – Eivind Sværen, shot putter (died 1986)

Full date unknown
Eivind Erichsen, economist and civil servant (died 2005)
Gudmund Harlem, politician and Minister (died 1988)
Odd Hovdenak, civil servant (died 1982)
Olav Harald Jensen, economist (died 1991)
Fredrik Mellbye, physician and chief medical officer (died 1999)
Tor Ørvig, paleontologist (died 1994)

Notable deaths

26 January – Oluf Iversen, politician (born 1847)
1 February – Georg Andreas Bull, architect and chief building inspector (born 1829)
17 March – Cæsar Peter Møller Boeck, dermatologist (born 1845)
16 May – Ole Olsen Malm, physician, veterinarian, civil servant and politician (b. 1854).
15 June – Kristian Birkeland, scientist (born 1867)
18 June – Oscar Ambrosius Castberg, painter and sculptor (born 1846)
19 June – Johan Gerhard Theodor Ameln, politician (born 1838)
4 August – Kristian Birch-Reichenwald Aars, academic (born 1868)

Full date unknown
Olaus Arvesen, educator and politician (born 1830)
Jørgen Brunchorst, politician and Minister (born 1862)
Hans Konrad Foosnæs, politician and Minister (born 1846)
Haagen Krog Steffens, historian, archivist and genealogist (born 1873)
Anders Sveaas, businessperson and consul (born 1840)
Georg August Thilesen, politician and Minister (born 1837)
Aasmund Halvorsen Vinje, politician and Minister (born 1851)

See also

References

External links

 
Norway
Norway